The Share Foundation is a not-for-profit organization founded by Canadian celebrities Rex Goudie and Shaun Majumder.  The organization was formed to help provide medical needs to the Baie Verte Peninsula, an area of Newfoundland in desperate need of medical assistance, as many services are not offered on the peninsula, and residents must travel great distances to receive proper care.

Medical and health organizations based in Newfoundland and Labrador